Teymuraz Gabashvili and Denys Molchanov were the defending champions, but did not participate.

Ilija Bozoljac and Michael Venus won the title, defeating Facundo Bagnis and Alex Bogomolov Jr. 7–5, 6–2 in the final.

Seeds

Draw

Draw

References
 Main Draw

Savannah Challenger - Doubles
2014 Doubles